Gabriela Dudeková (born 1968 in Hurbanovo) is a Slovak historian.

Biography
Dudeková  lives and works in Bratislava, Nitra (Slovakia) and Houston, Texas, USA. She has a degree in history from the Comenius University in Bratislava (1991). She completed her PhD degree in 2001 with the dissertation "Social policy of Hungary in late 19th and early 20th century and the social reform work of Georg Schulpe". She prepared the Slovak part of the Comparative non-profit sector project of Johns Hopkins University, Baltimore.
Dudeková works in the Institute of Historical Studies of Slovak Academy of Sciences. She is an author of articles and papers, co-author and author of the books. She regularly contributes to the topics of her interest on the scientific conferences in Slovakia and other European countries. 
She is the leader of VEGA project The opportunities for the professional and social accomplishment of women in the modern history.

Her study concentrates on social policy of Hungary in 1868–1918, situation of prisoners of war, propaganda and the life of civilians in World War I, social care and social situation in the area of Slovakia in the 19th century until 1918, gender studies and history of feminism.

Awards
In 2005, she was awarded the Moritz Csaky Award by the Austrian Academy of Sciences.

Main works
 1991 –  Comenius University 1991. 
 1994 – , Bratislava, YMCA 1994.
 1997 – , In: Fenomen nowoczesnego nacjonalizmu w Europie Środkowej, pod red. Bernarda Linka, Jorga Lüera, Kaia Struvego, Opole 1997  
 1997 – , The Johns Hopkins Comparative Nonprofit Sector Project, Bratislava: SPACE (working paper), 1997
 1998 – . SPACE Bratislava, 1998.
 1999 – . In: Podrimavský M., Kováč D. (Ed.).:  Slovensko na začiatku 20. storočia. Historický Ústav SAV, Bratislava 1999.
 2002 – , AHF Munich, 2002.
 2003 – , in: Bohemia 44 (2003) 2. , Berlin 2003.
 2004 –  In: Historický časopis, year 52/2, Bratislava 2004
 2007 – , In: Hahn, Hans Henning, Mannová, Elena (Ed.):   
 2007 – , In Miles Semper Honestus. , 2007, s. 125-135. .
 2007 – , In  - Scriptorium, 2007, pp. 123–142. 
 2008 – , 1913 , 2008, s. 147-169. .
 2009 –  DUDEKOVÁ, Gabriela - LENGYELOVÁ, Tünde. In , 2009, s. 44-85. 
 2009 – , In , 2009, Year 3, No. 1, pp. 1– 19. ISSN 1337-6861. http://www.forumhistoriae.sk.
 2009 – , In , 2009, pp. 329–349. 
 2009 – , In , 2009, Year 3, No. 1, pp. 1–2. ISSN 1337-6861.  
 2009 – , In , 2009, Year 57, No. 3, pp. 615–617. ISSN 0018-2575
 2009 – , In , 2009, No. 1, p. 71. ISSN 1335-4353
 2009 –  In . Bratislava, Slovak Academic Press, 1952-, 2009, Year 57, No. 1, pp. 182–183. ISSN 0018-2575
 2009 – , 1914–1918 JAKEŠOVÁ, Elena - DUDEKOVÁ, Gabriela - MANNOVÁ, Elena. In  1914-1918'. - Bratislava, 2008, pp. 161–214. 
 2011 – , DUDEKOVÁ, Gabriela - BEŇOVÁ, Katarína - BRTÁŇOVÁ, Erika - FALISOVÁ, Anna - FRANCOVÁ, Zuzana - HOLEC, Roman - HOLLÝ, Karol - HUČKOVÁ, Dana - HUPKO, Daniel - JANURA, Tomáš - KAČÍREK, Ľuboš - KODAJOVÁ, Daniela - KUŠNIRÁKOVÁ, Ingrid - LENGOVÁ, Jana - LENGYELOVÁ, Tünde - MACHAJDÍK, Igor - MACHO, Peter - MANNOVÁ, Elena - MONGU, Blanka - ORIŠKOVÁ, Mária - PODRIMAVSKÝ, Milan - ŠEMŠEJ, Matej - ŠTIBRANÁ, Ingrid - TIŠLIAR, Pavol - VESELSKÁ, Natália - VODOCHODSKÝ, Ivan - VRZGULOVÁ, Monika - ZAVACKÁ, Katarína - ZAVACKÁ, Marína - ZUBERCOVÁ, Magdaléna M. 1. . Bratislava : Veda, 2011. 773 . .
 2012 – , DUDEKOVÁ, Gabriela - GAUČÍK, Štefan - FALISOVÁ, Anna - KOVÁČ, Dušan - KURINCOVÁ, Elena. - KUŠNIRÁKOVÁ, Ingrid - LIPTÁK, Ľubomír - MANNOVÁ, Elena - MONGU, Blanka - MORAVČÍKOVÁ, Henrieta - TANZER, Jozef - ZAVACKÁ, Marína. . .

References

External links 
 Slovak Academy of Sciences
 Voluntary organizationis in Slovak history, e-book
 Die Slowakei – ein Fokus für transnationale Geschichtsforschung? On-line article
 Medzi vedou a politikou - večná dilema histórie ? Úvod do diskusie. In Forum historiae - odborný internetový časopis pre históriu a príbuzné spoločenské vedy, 2009, roč. 3, č. 1, s. 1-2. ISSN 1337-6861.  

1968 births
Living people
People from Hurbanovo
Slovak women academics
Historians of Europe
Historians of World War I
20th-century Slovak historians
Slovak feminists
Feminist historians
Members of the Slovak Academy of Sciences
Women historians
Comenius University alumni
21st-century Slovak historians